Pashtrikë or Pashtrik or Paštrik, is a mountain located in Kosovo and Albania. Its highest peak is located on their mutual border. The White Drin river passes along by it. Mount Pashtrik is the site of annual pilgrimages of residents from Has region of Prizren and Gjakova in Kosovo and from the border area of Albania.

History 

In the 15th century the Albanian toponym Darda was recorded in the region, which indicates an Albanian presence.

Tax register from 1452 show the inhabitants of Darda and the Pashtrik had mostly Albanian anthroponyms.

Overview 
Pashtrik is located in the historical region of Has, which up until the 16th century was named after the mountain. In the 17th century the name Has gained a prominence. It is a reference to the taxation status of the region which was taxed directly under the Ottoman Sultan instead of being part of the administrative divisions of the Ottoman Empire. Two-thirds of the mountain belongs to Albania. It is located in north-eastern Albania. The village of Krumë is positioned next to it. One-third of the mountain is in Kosovo. It is located in south-western Kosovo. The village of Gjonaj is positioned next to the mountain. It was built from Paleozoic core, covered by Mesozoic limestone, mostly under the vegetation.

Small mammals living in the mountain include the common vole, northern white-breasted hedgehog, balkan mole, and european mole. The blind mole occurs in the grasslands in old growth stands of beech forest.

Cult and pilgrimages
Mount Pashtrik has been considered sacred since ancient times. The old pagan cult is reflected in the annual pilgrimage of both Christians and Muslims that take place on the mountain. Catholic pilgrimages celebrate a two-day festival dedicated to the Assumption of Mary. The feast is called by locals "Feast of the Holy Trinity" (Albanian: Festa e Shëndritatit). Bektashi take pilgrimages to honor the legendary figure Sari Saltik (Albanian: Sari Salltëk), considering the mountain to contain one of his seven tombs. The Orthodox of Prizren consider the mountain to contain the tomb of Saint Pantaleimon, and take pilgrimages celebrating one whole night in summer.

The cult of the mountain and mountain tops is widespread among Albanians. This ancient practice is still preserved today, notably in Pashtrik, Lybeten, Tomorr, Gjallicë, Rumia, Koritnik, Shkëlzen, Mount Krujë, Shelbuem, Këndrevicë, Maja e Hekurave, Shëndelli and many others. In Albanian folk beliefs it is strictly related to the cult of Nature in general, and the cult of the Sun, the earth and water in particular. Every mountain is said to have its own nymph (Zana e malit). According to the top of the mountain where the nymphs stay, they get their specific name. Therefore Mount Pahtrik is the dwelling of Zana e Pashtrikut.

See also 
 Šar Mountains
 Koritnik
 Battle of Paštrik

References

Notes

Citations

Bibliography

Mountains of Kosovo
Mountains of Albania
Has (municipality)